Carlo Jungbluth (born 15 October 1958) is a retired Luxembourgian football defender.

References

1958 births
Living people
Luxembourgian footballers
Jeunesse Esch players
CS Pétange players
Association football defenders
Luxembourg international footballers